Colonel March Investigates is a 1953 British film consisting of the three pilot episodes of the TV series Colonel March of Scotland Yard that were filmed in 1952, starring Boris Karloff. These episodes were "Hot Money", "Death in the Dressing Room" and "The New Invisible Man".

Boris Karloff and his wife Evelyn sailed to England in July, 1952, where Karloff filmed three different pilot episodes of the Colonel March series to show to British TV executives. In 1953, when the show was green lighted, Karloff returned to England to film 23 more episodes, making a total of 26 in all, then returned to Hollywood to film Abbott and Costello Meet Dr. Jekyll and Mr. Hyde (1953). The three pilots were later compiled into the 1953 feature film called Colonel March Investigates (aka Colonel March of Scotland Yard), so that they could be shown theatrically.
Karloff filmed bits of onscreen narration to help unite the three stories and these scenes are exclusive to the compilation film only.

The Colonel March TV series premiered first in the United States from Dec. 1954 to Spring of 1955, with a total of 26 episodes. It was only broadcast on television in England in 1955 on Associated Television (ITV London, weekends), broadcast on 26 consecutive Saturday evenings from September 24, 1955 until March 17, 1956.

Plot
Karloff, in black eye patch and cloak, is Colonel March: head of the Department of Queer Complaints at Scotland Yard. He is an investigator of unusual criminal cases and activities. The film sees him solve a bank robbery (for which an innocent man was framed) and two murders involving complex tricks and disguises.

Cast
Colonel March –	Boris Karloff
Ames –	Ewan Roberts
Cabot –	Richard Wattis
John Parrish –	John Hewer
Joan Forsythe –	Sheila Burrell
Jim Hartley –	Anthony Forwood
Betty Hartley –	Patricia Owens
Mr. Bowlder –	Ronald Leigh-Hunt
Marjorie Dawson –	Joan Sims

Critical reception
TV Guide wrote, "the scripts are nothing special, but Karloff is a joy to watch, as usual."

References

External links

1955 films
1955 crime drama films
British crime drama films
1950s English-language films
1950s British films
British black-and-white films